National Poetry Day is a British campaign to promote poetry, including public performances.
National Poetry Day was founded in 1994 by William Sieghart. It takes place annually in the UK on the first Thursday in October. Since its inception, it has engaged millions of people across the country with live events, classroom activities and broadcasts. National Poetry Day is coordinated by the charity Forward Arts Foundation, whose mission is to celebrate excellence in poetry and increase its audience. Its other projects include the Forward Prizes for Poetry. The day is run in collaboration with partners including Arts Council England, Literature Wales, Poet in the City, Southbank Centre, The Poetry Book Society, The Poetry Society, The Scottish Poetry Library, Poetry By Heart and The Poetry School.

Prince Charles performed in the 2016 National Poetry Day, reading Seamus Heaney' The Shipping Forecast. On 2015 National Poetry Day poems were included on Blackpool Illuminations. In 2020 BT commissioned Poet Laureate Simon Armitage to write "Something clicked", a reflection on lockdown during the COVID-19 pandemic.

National Poetry Day 2022 is on 7 October. Events, readings and performances will take place across the UK to celebrate.

History
National Poetry Day was founded in 1994 by William Sieghart who said, "There are millions of talented poets out there and it's about time they got some recognition for their work. They shouldn’t be embarrassed about reading their work out aloud. I want people to read poetry on the bus on their way to work, in the street, in school and in the pub." National Poetry Day is celebrated around the UK. In 1994 the Radio Times wrote "National Poetry Day has been created to prove that poetry has a place in everyone's life. From children chanting to advertising jingles and pop songs, it is used to entertain and communicate across the nation."

The Belfast Newsletter reported, "National Poetry Day swept Ulster yesterday, transforming ordinary citizens into part-time bards or budding Heaneys or Wordsworths." The Daily Telegraph reported that in London at Waterloo station, "The announcement boards were given over to poems about trains by T S Eliot and Auden." The Times that reported Chris Meade, then director of the Poetry Society saying, "Readers are finding a place for poetry in their lives again. You can read one between stations on the Northern Line. It fits well into the modern experience." The East Anglian Daily Times reported, "National Poetry Day was the cue for a stanza bonanza, with railway stations, classrooms, theatres and supermarkets bursting with verse and echoing to epics".

Themes
Since 1999, National Poetry Day has been loosely “themed”. A list of previous themes is below:

 2022: The Environment
 2021: Choice
 2020: Vision
 2019: Truth
 2018: Change
 2017: Freedom
 2016: Messages
 2015: Light
 2014: Remember
 2013: Water, water everywhere
 2012: Stars
 2011: Games
 2010: Home
 2009: Heroes and Heroines
 2008: Work
 2007: Dreams
 2006: Identity
 2005: The Future
 2004: Food
 2003: Britain
 2002: Celebration
 2001: Journeys
 2000: Fresh Voices
 1999: Song Lyrics

See also
 National Poetry Month - a similar event in the United States
 World Poetry Day

References

British poetry
Thursday observances
Holidays and observances by scheduling (nth weekday of the month)